Federico Nicolás Haberkorn (born August 18, 1994) is an Argentine professional footballer who plays for FK Shkëndija of Macedonian First Football League.

References
 ascensomx.net
 ffm.mk  (Macedonian)

External links
 BDFA Profile 
 

Liga MX players
Living people
1994 births
Argentine footballers
Association football forwards
KF Shkëndija players
Gimnasia y Esgrima de Jujuy footballers
Cafetaleros de Chiapas footballers
Footballers from Buenos Aires